Hotze "Harry" Koch (22 October 1867 – 21 June 1942) was a Dutch-born American businessman who founded the Quanah Tribune-Chief newspaper. He was the father of Fred C. Koch (1900–1967), founder of Koch Industries.

Early life and education
Koch was born in the Dutch Frisian town of Workum, Netherlands. He was the second child of the physician Johan Anthon Koch (1836–1910) and Gatske Hotzes Jorritsma (1837–1876). Koch's paternal grandfather had been a shipowner from Sande in German East Frisia who had shipwrecked off the coast of Workum, where he eventually married the mayor's daughter. Koch's mother died during the birth of her eighth child, and his father remarried Petronella de Swart, the daughter of a banker. Harry Koch had five surviving siblings and another five half-siblings who all remained in the Netherlands. After working as a printer's apprentice in The Hague and (Germany), Koch emigrated to the United States in 1888. He first lived in Dutch enclaves in Chicago and Grand Rapids, Michigan, where he worked for Dutch-language newspapers.

Career and politics
Around 1890 he moved to Eastern Texas, where the humid climate drove him soon West to settle in the railroad town Quanah. At the time, Quanah had three newspapers, the Quanah Eagle, the Quanah Chief and the Quanah Tribune. He had saved enough to purchase the Quanah Tribune and then merged it with the Quanah Chief in 1897 forming the Quanah Tribune-Chief. He was also a founding shareholder of the Quanah, Acme and Pacific Railway. Koch used his newspaper to promote this railroad as well as his libertarian political ideas. During the depression, he fiercely opposed Franklin D. Roosevelt's New Deal and wrote opinion pieces against trade unions, retirement pensions, and the regulation of banks.

Personal life
In 1898, Koch married Margaret (Mattie) Mixson (born in 1874 in Quanah, TX; died 1941). She was the daughter of Hester (née Blessingame) and John Baptist Mixson (1851–1927) of Quanah, Texas (he was the son of Simeon Mixson and Margaret Campbell). They had two sons:
 Anton Koch worked as advertising manager at the Tribune-Chief.
 Fred C. Koch (1900–1967) went on to found Koch Industries.

References

External links
 Quanah Tribune-Chief frontpage
 

1867 births
1942 deaths
19th-century Dutch people
American newspaper publishers (people)
American people of Frisian descent
Dutch emigrants to the United States
Dutch printers
Harry
People from Nijefurd
Old Right (United States)
19th-century American businesspeople
Dutch businesspeople
People from Quanah, Texas
American libertarians